Ryan Kamp (born 12 December 2000) is a Dutch cyclo-cross and road cyclist, who currently rides for UCI Continental team . As a junior, he won the silver medal at the 2018 UCI Cyclo-cross World Championships. He won the gold medal in the men's under-23 event at the 2020 UCI Cyclo-cross World Championships in Dübendorf.

Major results

Cyclo-cross

2016–2017
 2nd National Junior Championships
 2nd Junior Oostmalle
 Junior Brico Cross
2nd Hulst
3rd Bredene
 Junior Superprestige
3rd Hoogstraten
 Junior DVV Trophy
3rd Essen
2017–2018
 1st  National Junior Championships
 UCI Junior World Cup
2nd Namur
2nd Koksijde
 2nd Overall Junior Superprestige
1st Hoogstraten
1st Ruddervoorde
1st Gieten
2nd Diegem
 Junior DVV Trophy
2nd Lille
3rd Loenhout
3rd Essen
 Junior Brico Cross
1st Eeklo
 1st Junior Rucphen
 2nd Junior Oostmalle
 2nd Junior Brabant
 3rd  UCI World Junior Championships
2018–2019
 1st  National Under-23 Championships
 2nd Under-23 Gullegem
 3rd Under-23 Oostmalle
2019–2020
 1st  UCI World Under-23 Championships
 1st  National Under-23 Championships
 2nd Overall UCI Under-23 World Cup
1st Hoogerheide
1st Nommay
2nd Namur
2nd Bern
3rd Koksijde
 Under-23 DVV Trophy
1st Brussels
1st Ronse
2nd Hamme
2nd Koppenberg
3rd Lille
 2nd Vittel
 3rd Boulzicourt
2020–2021
 1st  UEC European Under-23 Championships
 2nd  UCI World Under-23 Championships
2021–2022
 1st  UEC European Under-23 Championships
 UCI Under-23 World Cup
2nd Tábor
2nd Flamanville
2022–2023
 1st  Team relay, UCI World Championships
 Copa de España
1st Pontevedra
 1st Oisterwijk
 1st Marín
 Exact Cross
2nd Zonnebeke
 3rd National Championships
 3rd Maldegem
 3rd Woerden

References

External links
 
 
 

2000 births
Living people
Cyclo-cross cyclists
Dutch male cyclists
Sportspeople from Heerenveen
Cyclists from Friesland
21st-century Dutch people